The 7th Annual MTV Millennial Awards took place on June 23, 2019 at the Palacio de los Deportes in Mexico City. It was broadcast live by MTV Latin America. The awards celebrated the best of Latin music and the digital world of the millennial generation. The list of nominees were revealed on May 6, 2019. Leading the list of nominees were J Balvin, Bad Bunny and Paulo Londra with five nominations each and Anitta with three nominations under her belt.

Hosts
Luis Gerardo Méndez
Calle & Poché

Performers
 Karol G -  "Punto G" and "Mi Cama" 
 Ed Maverick
 Piso 21
 Mario Bautista
 Aléman
 Halsey -  "Without Me" and "Nightmare"
 Bad Bunny - "Callaíta", "Se Estuviésemos Juntos" and "Ni Bien Ni Mal"

Nominees
 Winners are highlighted in boldface.

ICON MIAW
 Calle y Poché 
 Pautips
 JD Pantoja
 Lizbeth Rodríguez
 Lele Pons
 La Divaza
 Kimberly Loaiza
 Luisito Comunica

Artist miaw 
 Bad Bunny
 Rosalía
 J Balvin
 Maluma
 Becky G
 Ozuna
 Reik
 Sebastián Yatra

Explosion k-pop 
 Blackpink
 BTS
 EXO
 GOT7
 Ikon
 Red Velvet
 Super Junior
 Twice

UP WOMEN!
 Mon Laferte
 Yalitza Aparicio
 Alexa Moreno
 Rosalía
 YosStop
 Viko Volkóva

HIT GLOBAL
 Ariana Grande – Thank U, Next
 Billie Eilish – Bad Guy
 Cardi B, Bad Bunny, & J Balvin – I Like It
 Halsey – Without Me
 Jonas Brothers – Sucker
 Lady Gaga & Bradley Cooper – Shallow
 Marshmello Feat. Bastille – Happier
 Silk City & Dua Lipa p. Diplo & Mark Ronson – Electricity

Hit of the year 
 Anuel AA & Karol G – Secreto
 Bad Bunny Feat. Drake – Mia
 Daddy Yankee Feat. Snow – Con Calma
 Maluma – Mala Mia
 Ozuna – Baila Baila Baila
 Paulo Londra – Adán y Eva
 Pedro Capó & Farruko – Calma (Remix)
 Reik Feat. Maluma – Amigos con Derechos

Video of the year 
 Babasónicos – La Pregunta
 Javiera Mena – Mirror
 Juanes – Pa Inside
 Mon Laferte – El Beso
 Rosalía – Pienso En Tu Mirá
 Ximena Sariñana – Si Tü Te Vas

Artist + chingon Mexico 
 Café Tacvba – #MTVLACHINGONTACVBA
 Jesse & Joy – #MTVLACHINGONJESSEJOY
 Mon Laferte – #MTVLACHINGONMON
 Reik – #MTVLACHINGONREIK
 Sofía Reyes – #MTVLACHINGONREYES
 Ximena Sariñana – #MTVLACHINGONSARINANA

Artist + duro Colombia 
 J Balvin – #MTVLADUROBALVIN
 Karol G – #MTVLADUROKAROL
 Maluma – #MTVLADUROMALUMA
 Manuel Turizo – #MTVLADUROTURIZO
 Floor 21 – # MTVLADUROPISO21
 Sebastián Yatra – #MTVLADUROYATRA

Artist + flama Argentina 
 Duki – #MTVLAFLAMADUKI
 Lali – #MTVLAFLAMALALI
 The Authentic Decadents – #MTVLAFLAMADECADENTES
 Neo Pistea – #MTVLAFLAMAPISTEA
 Paulo Londra – #MTVLAFLAMALONDRA
 Tini – #MTVLAFLAMATINI

Bromance of the year 
 Jawy & Tadeo – #MTVLABROJAWYTADEO
 JD Pantoja & Supertrucha – #MTVLABROPANSUPER
 Mario Ruiz & Juanpa Zurita – #MTVLABROMARIOZURITA
 Ami Rodríguez & Javi Ramírez – #MTVLABROAMIJAVI
 Mau & Ricky – #MTVLABROMAURICKY
 Berth Oh & Luisito Comunica – #MTVLABROLUISBERTH
 Alex Caniggia & Fritanga – #MTVLABROALEXFRITANGA

Risadictos 
 Backdoor – #MTVLARISABACKDOOR
 Golden Scorpion – #MTVLARISAESCORPION
 Que Parió – #MTVLARISAQUEPARIO
 Mario Aguilar – #MTVLARISAAGUILAR
 I Summarize It So Nomás – #MTVLARISARESUMO
 The Podcast of Alex Fernández – #MTVLARISAFERNANDEZ

Reality of the year 
 Acapulco Shore 6 – #MTVLAREALITYACASHORE
 I will resist – #MTVLAREALITYRESISTIRE
 Nailed It! Mexico – #MTVLAREALITYNAILEDIT
 To Order With Marie Kondo – #MTVLAREALITYKONDO
 RuPaul's Drag Race 11 – #MTVLAREALITYDRAGRACE

Killer series 
 Game Of Thrones 8 – #MTVLASERIEGOT
 You – #MTVLASERIEYOU
 Elite'' – #MTVLASERIEELITE
 Hanna – #MTVLASERIEHANNA
 The Handmaid's Tale – #MTVLASERIEHANDMAIDS

 Streamer of the year 
 WindyGirk – #MTVLASTREAMERWINDY
 Ari Gameplays – #MTVLASTREAMERARI
 Fernanfloo – #MTVLASTREAMERFERNANFLOO
 Fang8712 – #MTVLASTREAMERFang8712
 Coscu – #MTVLASTREAMERCOSCU

 Couple in flames 
 Aristemo – #MTVLAPAREJAARISTEMO
 Juliantina – #MTVLAPAREJAJULIANTINA
 Rio & Tokyo – Money Heist – #MTVLAPAREJARIOTOKIO
 Marina & Nano – Elite'' – #MTVLAPAREJAMARINANO

#instacrush 
 Sebastián Yatra – #MTVLACRUSHYATRA
 Mane – #MTVLACRUSHMANE
 Danny Alfaro – #MTVLACRUSHALFARO
 David Allegre – #MTVLACRUSHALLEGRE
 Brianda Deyanara – #MTVLACRUSHBRIANDA
 Luis Gerardo Méndez – #MTVLACRUSHMENDEZ
 Paulo Londra – #MTVLACRUSHLONDRA
 Manuel Turizo – #MTVLACRUSHTURIZO

#INSTAPETS
 Octavio from Kenia Os – #MTVLAPETSOCTAVIO
 Puca by Juanpa Zurita – #MTVLAPETSPUCA
 Mailo by Dhasia Wezka – #MTVLAPETSMAILO
 Dogs Hoffman by YosStop – #MTVLAPETSHOFFMAN
 Piggy Smallz by Ariana Grande – #MTVLAPETSPIGGY
 Miss Asia by Lady Gaga – #MTVLAPETSASIA

Instastories 
 Dhasia Wezka – #MTVLASTORIESDHASIA
 Kenia Os – #MTVLASTORIESKENIA
 Anitta – #MTVLASTORIESANITTA
 Alex Casas – #MTVLASTORIESCASAS
 Kimberly Loaiza – #MTVLASTORIESKIMBERLY
 Sebastian Villalobos —#MTVLASTORIESVILLALOBOS
 Sebastián Yatra – #MTVLASTORIESYATRA
 La Divaza – #MTVLASTORIESLADIVAZA

Fandom of the year 
 BTS Army – #MTVLAFANDOMBTSARMY
 Arianators – #MTVLAFANDOMARIANATORS
 Aristemo Fans – #MTVLAFANDOMARISTEMOFANS
 Juliantina Fans – #MTVLAFANDOMJULIANTINAFANS
 Super Junior ELF – #MTVLAFANDOMSUPERJUNIORELF
 Selenators – #MTVLAFANDOMSELENATORS

Influence + fresca 
 Daniela Legarda – #MTVLAINFLULEGARDA
 Gonzok – #MTVLAINFLUGONZOK
 Ana VBon – #MTVLAINFLUVBON
 Andrea Zúñiga – #MTVLAINFLUZUNIGA
 Supertrucha – #MTVLAINFLUSUPERTRUCHA
 Pedrito VM – #MTVLAINFLUPEDRITO
 Killadamente – #MTVLAINFLUKILLADAMENTE

Ridiculo of the year 
 Galilea Montijo "Roma" – #MTVLARIDICULOGALILEA
 Belinda Albureada – #MTVLARIDICULOBELINDA
 Dress by Angelique Boyer – #MTVLARIDICULOVESTIDOBOYER
 Sergio Goyri against Yalitza – #MTVLARIDICULOSERGIOGOYRI
 Cardi B vs. Nicki Minaj – #MTVLARIDICULOCARDIMINAJ

VIRAL PUMP
 Exposing Infidels – #MTVLABOMBAINFIELES
 Ayuwoki – #MTVLABOMBAAYUWOKI
 10 Years Challenge – # MTVLABOMBA10YEARS
 Old Lesbian – #MTVLABOMBAVIEJOLESBIANO
 Do you hear me, hear me, feel me? – #MTVLABOMBAMEESCUCHAN
 Chimuelo – #MTVLABOMBACHIMUELO
 Milhouse Challenge – #MTVLABOMBAMILHOUSE
 Chi Cheñol – #MTVLABOMBACHICHENOL

Global instagramer 
 Jacob Levitz– #MTVLAINSTAGLJacobLevitz
Ariana Grande – #MTVLAINSTAGLARIANA
 Shawn Mendes – #MTVLAINSTAGLSHAWN
 Jungkook – #MTVLAINSTAGLJUNGKOOK
 Billie Eilish – #MTVLAINSTAGLBILLIE
 Bad Bunny – #MTVLAINSTAGLBADBUNNY
 Juanpa Zurita – #MTVLAINSTAGLZURITA
 J Balvin – #MTVLAINSTAGLBALVIN

Instagramer level god Mexico 
 Kenia Os – #MTVLAINSTAMXKENIA
 Mane – #MTVLAINSTAMXMANE
 Malcriado.X – #MTVLAINSTAMXMALCRIADO
 Berth Oh – #MTVLAINSTAMXBERTH
 Kim Shantal – #MTVLAINSTAMXKIM 
 Gisselle Kuri – #MTVLAINSTAMXGISSELLE
 Danna Paola – #MTVLAINSTAMXDANNA
 Mario Bautista – #MTVLAINSTAMXBAUTISTA

Instagramer level god Colombia 
 Llane – #MTVLAINSTACOLLANE
 Luisa Fernanda W – #MTVLAINSTACOLUISA
 Reykon – #MTVLAINSTACOREYKON
 Mafe Méndez – #MTVLAINSTACOMAFE
 Karol G – #MTVLAINSTACOKAROL
 Javi Ramírez – #MTVLAINSTACOJAVI
 Laura Tobon – #MTVLAINSTACOLAURA
 Mario Ruíz – #MTVLAINSTACOMARIO

Instagramer god level Argentina 
 Paulo Londra – #MTVLAINSTAARLONDRA
 María Becerra – #MTVLAINSTAARBECERRA
 Charlotte Caniggia – #MTVLAINSTAARCHARLOTTE
 Kevsho – #MTVLAINSTAARKEVSHO
 Tini – #MTVLAINSTAARTINI
 Agustín Casanova – #MTVLAINSTAARCASANOVA
 Duki – #MTVLAINSTAARDUKI
 Lali – #MTVLAINSTAARLALI

Viral artist 
 Anitta – #MTVLAVIRALANITTA
 Anuel AA – #MTVLAVIRALANUEL
 Cazzu – #MTVLAVIRALCAZZU
 Lele Pons – #MTVLAVIRALLELE
 Mario Bautista – #MTVLAVIRALBAUTISTA
 Natti Natasha – #MTVLAVIRALNATASHA
 Paloma Mami – #MTVLAVIRALMAMI
 Thalia – #MTVLAVIRALTHALIA

Music-ship of the year 
 Bad Bunny Feat. Drake – Mia
 Becky G & Paulo Londra – When I Kiss You
 DJ Snake Feat. Selena Gomez, Cardi B, Ozuna – Taki Taki
 Los Auténticos Decadentes & Mon Laferte – Love
 Mau & Ricky Feat. Manuel Turizo, Camilo – Unknown
 Reik Feat. Wisin & Yandel – Duele
 Rosalía Feat. J Balvin, El Guincho – With Altura
 Sofía Reyes Feat. Anitta & Rita Ora – RIP

EMERGENT
 German
 Chinese Bándalos
Aleman
 Ca7riel
 Ed Maverick
 Elsa and Elmar
 Ghetto Kids
 Juan Ingaramo
 Vice Menta

Tiktoker of the year 
 Jean Carlo León
 Amara Que Linda
 Ami Rodríguez
 Xime Ponch
 Joaquín Orellana S
 Ivanna Pérez
 Kevlex

References

2019 television awards
2019 music awards
2019 in Latin music
2019 in Mexico
Events in Mexico City